Usak-Kichu (Uśaqkisew) is a rural locality (a selo) and the administrative centre of Kalininsky Selsoviet, Bizhbulyaksky District, Bashkortostan, Russia. The population was 767 as of 2010. There are 9 streets.

Geography 
Usak-Kichu is located 25 km northeast of Bizhbulyak (the district's administrative centre) by road. Ittikhat is the nearest rural locality.

References 

Rural localities in Bizhbulyaksky District